The Spray Mountains is a mountain range of the Canadian Rockies located in southwestern Alberta, Canada.

This range includes the following mountains and peaks:

References

Mountain ranges of Alberta
Ranges of the Canadian Rockies